Boom Basin is a small basin on the north side of Radian Ridge, immediately west of the confluence of Pipecleaner Glacier and Radian Glacier, Royal Society Range. A loud explosive boom was heard by members of a New Zealand Geological Survey field party working in the area on 3 December 1977. They suggested the name. The source of the noise remained a mystery.

References
 

Structural basins of Antarctica
Landforms of Victoria Land
Scott Coast